The 1935 Baylor Bears football team represented Baylor University in the Southwest Conference (SWC) during the 1935 college football season. In their 10th season under head coach Morley Jennings, the Bears compiled an 8–3 record (3–3 against conference opponents), tied for third place in the conference, and outscored opponents by a combined total of 122 to 75. They played their home games at Carroll Field in Waco, Texas. Wendell W. Simpson was the team captain.

Schedule

References

Baylor
Baylor Bears football seasons
Baylor Bears football